Herbison may refer to:

 Jason Herbison (born 1972), Australian writer
 Jean Herbison (1923–2007), New Zealand academic, educator, researcher and Chancellor of the University of Canterbury
 Judith Herbison (born 1971), former Irish international cricketer 
 Margaret (Peggy) Herbison (1907–1996), Scottish politician
 Nancy Herbison (born 1957), Canadian opera singer, see Nancy Argenta